Pedicularis lanata is a species of flowering plant in the family Orobanchaceae. It is native to Canada and Alaska. Its common names include woolly lousewort and bumble-bee flower.

Description
The narrow leaves are lobed or compound, the lower on long petioles. The woolly, many-flowered inflorescence is dense when new, elongating with maturity. The corolla is up to 2 centimeters long and is usually dark pink, but sometimes white. It is surrounded by toothed sepals. The seeds have a honeycomb-patterned surface. P. lanata is dependend on insect in order to set seeds.

P. lanata has a breeding system with high capacity for outcrossing in West Greenland (Disko) and also show great morphological variation, compared to P. flammea, P. hirsuta and P. lapponica.

Distribution 
P. lanata is native to Canada and Alaska, and is also found in Russia and Svalbard.

References

lanata
Flora of Alaska
Flora of Canada
Flora without expected TNC conservation status
Flora of Greenland